Persicula rashafuni is a species of sea snail, a marine gastropod mollusk, in the family Cystiscidae.

Distribution

This species occurs in the Indian Ocean off Somalia.

References

rashafuni
Gastropods described in 1993
Cystiscidae